Brother Edmund Rice Catholic Secondary School (equally known as Brother Edmund Rice CSS, BERCSS, Brother Edmund Rice, or Rice) is a former publicly funded high school in Toronto, Ontario, Canada managed by the Toronto Catholic District School Board. It was named after Edmund Ignatius Rice, a Roman Catholic missionary and educationalist and the founder of two religious institutes of religious brothers: the Congregation of Christian Brothers and the Presentation Brothers.

See also
List of high schools in Ontario

References

External links
 Brother Edmund Rice Catholic Secondary School
 TCDSB Portal
 St. Josaphat Catholic School
 St. John the Evangelist Catholic School
 École élémentaire Charles-Sauriol

Toronto Catholic District School Board
High schools in Toronto
Catholic secondary schools in Ontario
Educational institutions established in 1977
Educational institutions disestablished in 2001
1977 establishments in Ontario
Congregation of Christian Brothers secondary schools
2001 disestablishments in Ontario